Donald Holder is an American lighting designer in theatre, opera and dance based in New York. He was born in 1962. He has been nominated for fourteen Tony Awards, winning the 1998 Tony Award for Best Lighting Design as well as the Drama Desk Award for Outstanding Lighting Design for The Lion King. He won a second Tony in 2008 for the revival of South Pacific. His lighting design for Paradise Square has been nominated for a 2022 Tony Award for Best Lighting Design of a Musical. Additional Broadway credits include: Tootsie, Anastasia, Kiss Me Kate, Fiddler on the Roof, The Bridges of Madison County, She Loves Me, The Cherry Orchard, The King and I, Big Fish, Annie (2012 Broadway revival), Golden Boy, Spider-Man: Turn Off the Dark, Arcadia, The Motherfucker With The Hat, Promises, Promises, Les Liaisons Dangereuses, Radio Golf, The Little Dog Laughed, Movin' Out, The Times They Are a-Changin', A Streetcar Named Desire, Holiday, Cyrano de Bergerac, and Prelude to a Kiss. Off-Broadway credits include Jeffrey and The Most Fabulous Story Ever Told. He was the theatrical lighting designer for seasons one and two of the NBC-Universal television series Smash.

Holder studied forestry at the University of Maine, where he graduated from in 1980. He also worked for the Portland Stage Company in Maine. He holds a Masters of Fine Arts from the Yale School of Drama and is a student of Jennifer Tipton.  He was the head of lighting design from 2006-2010 in the School of Theater at the California Institute of the Arts, and is currently Head of Lighting Design at the Rutgers University Mason Gross School of the Arts.

Awards and nominations

References

External links
 
 Livedesign magazine article on Holder
Authorsden.com article

American lighting designers
Tony Award winners
Drama Desk Award winners
University of Maine alumni
Yale School of Drama alumni
Living people
Year of birth missing (living people)